Zimbabwe participated at the 2018 Summer Youth Olympics in Buenos Aires, Argentina from 6 October to 18 October 2018.

Athletics

Equestrian

Zimbabwe qualified a rider based on its ranking in the FEI World Jumping Challenge Rankings.

 Individual Jumping - 1 athlete

Field hockey

 Girls' field hockey

 Preliminary round

Ninth and tenth place

Judo

Individual

Team

Rowing

Swimming

References

2018 in Zimbabwean sport
Nations at the 2018 Summer Youth Olympics
Zimbabwe at the Youth Olympics